Sipe Springs is a ghost town in Milam County, Texas, near Rockdale. In the early 1900s, Sipe Springs had a two-teacher school with 63 students, but the school consolidated in 1931, and soon nothing remained in the community.

References

Ghost towns in Milam County, Texas